The Government of Jammu and Kashmir is the governing authority of the Indian union territory of Jammu and Kashmir and its two divisions and 20 districts.

Jammu and Kashmir is a union territory in India under the terms of Article 239A (which was initially applied to Puducherry and is now also applicable to the union territory as per the Jammu and Kashmir Reorganisation Act, 2019) of the Constitution of India. Jammu and Kashmir has executive, legislative and judicial branches of government. Srinagar and Jammu are the summer and winter capitals of Jammu and Kashmir respectively.

Executive
The head of state of Jammu and Kashmir is a Lieutenant Governor, appointed by the President of India on the advice of the central government. His or her post is largely ceremonial. The Chief Minister, is the head of government and chairs a council of ministers.

Council of Ministers of Jammu and Kashmir
A Council of Ministers led by a Chief Minister is appointed by the Lieutenant Governor from the membership of the legislative assembly. Their role is to advise the Lieutenant Governor in the exercise of functions in matters under the jurisdiction of the legislative assembly. In other matters, the Lieutenant Governor is empowered to act in his own capacity.

The council of ministers will be formed following the Next Legislative Assembly election. Until then, executive power is vested in the lieutenant governor. The central Government of India can appoint advisers to the council to assist the lieutenant governor with his duties. Since the formation of the union territory in October 2019, the advisors to the lieutenant governor have been acting as "ministers" and are authorised with the same power as ministers.

Advisers to the lieutenant governor:
 Arun Kumar Mehta (Chief secretary)
Rajeev Rai Bhatnagar
Farooq Khan
In 2018, Jammu and Kashmir Infrastructure Development Finance Corporation (JKIDFC) was set-up to speed up languishing infrastructure development in the union territory.

Legislative
The legislative branch is of government is a unicameral legislative assembly, whose tenure is five years. The legislative assembly may make laws for any of the matters in the State List of the Constitution of India except "public order" and "police", which will remain the preserve of the central Government of India. The Lieutenant Governor also has the power to promulgate ordinances which have the same force as the acts of the legislative assembly.

Elections for the Jammu and Kashmir Legislative Assembly were promised to be held following the implementation of new constituency boundaries, which was expected to be completed in 2021.

Judicial
The union territory is under the jurisdiction of the Jammu and Kashmir High Court, which also serves as high court for neighbouring Ladakh. Police services are provided by the Jammu and Kashmir Police.

Local self government 

Panchayati Raj in the union territory allows for the creation of District Development Councils.

References

External links 
General Administration Department
Jammu and Kashmir district portal